The University of New Hampshire at Manchester (UNH Manchester) is the urban campus of the public University of New Hampshire and is located in Manchester, New Hampshire. It was established in 1985 as the sixth college of the University of New Hampshire.

Location

As of March 2015, the University of New Hampshire's campus in Manchester is located in the  Pandora Mill at 88 Commercial Street, on the banks of the Merrimack River in Manchester's historic Amoskeag Millyard. The move to 88 Commercial Street increased the physical plant of the college by almost 50%, as from 2001 to 2014 the school was located in the  University Center building at 400 Commercial Street.

Due to its location in the heart of Manchester, the largest city in northern New England, UNH Manchester is within a 30-minute drive of more than half of New Hampshire's population. Many of the college's students commute to campus from towns inside the Manchester-Nashua metro area, which as of 2013 had a total population of 403,895. Manchester itself has a city population of 110,378 (2013) and an urban area population of 158,377 (2013). Home to ten colleges and universities and more than 10,000 post-secondary students, Manchester was rated, in 2015, one of the "Five Coolest College Towns in New England" by Campus News.

Nationally, Manchester ranks thirteenth on a list of the best cities in America to live and launch a business in (CNN Money); second in tax-friendliness (Kiplinger); first on a list of the cheapest places to live (Forbes); seventh in upward income mobility (Business Insider); eighth in the best cities for tech jobs (Fast Company); and second in the overall happiness of its citizens (Men's Health). Overall, New Hampshire ranks ninth in the U.S. in high-tech employment concentration, with most of these jobs located in Manchester and its immediate environs.

In recent years the Amoskeag Millyard and its residential historic district have experienced continual redevelopment. Many properties originally built in the nineteenth century as tenement housing for mill workers have been retro-fitted to create stylish and eclectic residential condominiums, retail stores, and restaurants. The Pandora Mill is one such converted mill building, situated between the Merrimack and a large cluster of new developments. Elm Street, a block to the east, is the commercial center of the city and northern New England.

Academics
The University of New Hampshire's urban campus provides associate, bachelor's, and master's degrees, with a special emphasis on programs that address urban issues and integrate undergraduate and graduate study with Manchester's thriving professional and business communities.

In addition to its wide range of academic and non-academic community outreach programs, the campus has a collaborative agreement with the neighboring New Hampshire Institute of Art that allows students interested in the fine arts to enroll in the Institute's Bachelor of Fine Arts program.  The campus also has an articulation agreement with the Massachusetts College of Pharmacy and Health Sciences that allows students to dual enroll in the pre-pharmacy or physician assistant programs offered at the latter's Manchester location. UNHM has also established a partnership with the Institute at Palazzo Rucellai in Florence, Italy, which allows students in the former's Politics and Society program to study abroad. UNHM also provides valuable student resources, such as workshops and tutoring, through its Center for Academic Enrichment.

The student-faculty ratio at the university's urban campus is 13:1, and 97% of classes have fewer than 30 students. While the College has always attracted a significant cohort of non-traditional students, in recent years the demographics of the student body in Manchester have shifted considerably. In 2006, 59% of students were between the ages of 17 and 23, with 41% 24 or older; by 2013, only 34% of students were 24 or older, with 66% of the student body between the ages of 17 and 23.

STEM emphasis
Critical to the academic mission of the University of New Hampshire's campus in Manchester is emphasizing student learning in and out of the classroom, particularly in the STEM fields. A significant percentage of the 1,000 students studying at the urban campus secure for-credit internships in the Manchester business community, often in STEM-oriented companies, and the college in turn offers use of the UNH STEM Discovery Lab to members of the local community, particularly K-12 students and their teachers. UNHM Community Outreach Scholarship further serves the Manchester community by maintaining a massive data archive relating to the City of Manchester and its public policy initiatives. This archive is an official part of the UNH Dimond Library Digital Collections Initiative.

Study abroad programs
Students can take advantage of opportunities to study outside of the United States through UNH-managed programs such as the Florence Summer Program, UNH exchange programs, or UNH-approved programs. The National Student Exchange also allows a student to take a semester at a public college or university anywhere in the United States or its territories.

Rankings
Ordinarily, as a college of the University of New Hampshire, UNHM is not ranked by media outlets as a discrete institution. However, in 2013 Washington Monthly ranked UNH's urban college #14 in the United States in an assessment of best-value liberal arts colleges. In 2022, Money.com ranked UNH Manchester #204 out of all colleges and universities in the United States in an assessment of educational quality, affordability, and career outcomes. The undergraduate colleges of UNH located in Durham ranked #170 in the Money.com assessment.

In 2012, UNH Dining, which services the UNH colleges in both Manchester and Durham, was ranked in the top 50 nationally by The Daily Meal, whose "Best Colleges for Food in America" listing rates universities' dining options on accessibility, service, healthiness, sustainability, and use of local products.

Student life

Housing
While many UNHM students commute to campus from towns in the greater Manchester area, UNH Manchester announced the opening of a new UNH residence hall in fall 2018.

Located at 1000 Elm Street, UNH Downtown Commons offers double and triple rooms, on-site dining, laundry facilities, and other amenities. The residence hall is a 14-minute walk to campus, and steps from downtown Manchester’s restaurants, shops and nightlife.

UNH Manchester also partners with the New Hampshire Institute of Art to offer meals in the NHIA dining hall, located on Spring Street.

Activities
Students at UNHM participate in many student-led academic, recreational, and special-interest clubs.

Athletics

The University of New Hampshire's athletic program consists of 18 NCAA programs, all of which play at the Durham campus of the university. However, Manchester does on occasion host home games of the UNH men's ice hockey team. Games are held at SNHU Arena, a few blocks from the UNH Manchester campus, with a seating capacity of 11,770 (9,852 for ice hockey). SNHU Arena has also hosted other college and professional teams, such as the NCAA Frozen Four Tournament and the Manchester Monarchs hockey teams.

Publications
Millworks and Campus Connections tell the UNH Manchester story and connect students and other members of the UNHM community to the campus. Both publications are coordinated by the UNHM Marketing and Community Relations Office, and feature articles on student achievements, faculty research, and community partnerships.

Off-campus events
Manchester is home to the New Hampshire Fisher Cats, the Double-A affiliate of Major League Baseball's Toronto Blue Jays. The Fisher Cats play home games at Northeast Delta Dental Stadium, a 7,722-seat venue approximately a half-mile from UNH Manchester. Other local attractions include the historic Palace Theater, the Currier Museum of Art, the New Hampshire Institute of Art, and the SEE Science Center, an interactive learning facility adjacent to the UNH Manchester campus.

Public programs
The University of New Hampshire's Manchester campus connects the research and knowledge of students, faculty, and staff with the local community through public programs and events. The UNHM Speaker's Bureau runs a lecture series that pairs researchers at UNHM with academic partners like middle schools, high schools, and community colleges. Through the Bureau, campus faculty and students share, free of charge, their disciplinary expertise and research experience in the STEM fields, the social sciences, and the humanities. In addition, the campus sponsors films, book clubs, brown-bag luncheon lectures, the Sidore lecture series, and Music in the Mills (an initiative supported by the Frederick Smyth Foundation) to provide those living in and around Manchester with an opportunity to learn and discover.

References

External links

Educational institutions established in 1985
Education in Manchester, New Hampshire
Manchester
Public universities and colleges in New Hampshire
Universities and colleges in Hillsborough County, New Hampshire
Buildings and structures in Manchester, New Hampshire
1985 establishments in New Hampshire
Satellite campuses